The 1907 Delaware football team was an American football team that represented Delaware College (later renamed the University of Delaware) as an independent during the 1907 college football season. In its first year under head coach E. Pratt King, the team compiled a 0–5–1 record.

Schedule

References

Delaware
Delaware Fightin' Blue Hens football seasons
College football winless seasons
Delaware Football